Ride Again is an extended play by British-American pop-rock group Shakespears Sister, released on 25 October 2019. The EP features three new songs along with new mixes of the two previously released tracks from Singles Party (2019), "All the Queen's Horses" and "C U Next Tuesday".

Track listing

Personnel
Credits for Ride Again adapted from liner notes.

 Siobhan Fahey/Marcella Detroit – vocals
 Marcella Detroit – guitars, harmonica and keys
 Larry Mullins AKA Toby Dammit – drums, timpani and vibraphone
 Scott Bassman – bass ("All the Queen's Horses" and "C U Next Tuesday")
 Ming Vauz – bass ("Time to Say Goodbye", "When She Finds You" and "Dangerous Game")
 Gillian Rivers – strings
 Greg Forman – hammond organ ("C U Next Tuesday")
 Marco Pirroni – guitar ("All the Queen's Horses")
 Kate Garner – photography
 Kim Bowen – styling
 Bruce Gill at Green Ink – design

Charts

References 

2019 debut EPs
Shakespears Sister albums
London Records EPs